Junín is a municipality and town of Colombia in the Guavio Province, part of the department of Cundinamarca. Junín borders Gachetá and Guatavita in the north, Gama and Gachalá in the east, Fómeque in the south, and La Calera and Guasca in the west.

Etymology 
The former name Chipazaque of Junín refers to the shared terrain by the zipa and zaque, the most important caciques of the Muisca Confederation. In Muysccubun it means "our father the zaque" or "union between zipa and zaque". The name Junín was given by Tomas Cipriano de Mosquera in 1861, because the green valleys reminded him of the Pampa de Junín, location of the Battle of Junín in Peru.

History 
Before the Spanish conquest of the Muisca, the green hills of Junín, then called Chipazaque, were a shared terrain between the zipa of Bacatá and the zaque of Hunza. The conquistadors reached the area of Junín in 1550 and founded the modern town.

Economy 
Main economical activities of Junín are agriculture, livestock farming and tourism.

Gallery

References 

Municipalities of Cundinamarca Department
Populated places established in 1550
1550 establishments in the Spanish Empire
Muisca Confederation